Vátnjavárri is a Sámi hamlet in the Tjeldsund, Troms og Finnmark, Norway. It was previously part of the municipality of Skånland, which merged with Tjeldsund in 2020.

The hamlet was home to the Boltås skole, a bilingual Sámi–Norwegian public primary school. The school closed in 2013 at which time it had 25 students in seven classes.

References

Skånland
Villages in Troms og Finnmark